Mihailo Ristić-Džervinac (1854–1916) was a Serbian officer, co-conspirator of the May Coup, and chief of the Upper Staff of East Povardarie during the Serbian Chetnik operations in Old Serbia and Macedonia in the beginning of the 20th century.

Life
He hailed from a village near Svrljig. He died in 1916 in Ferryville near Bizerte.

May Coup

He was the one who shot King Alexander and Queen Draga.

References

Serbian military personnel
Royal Serbian Army soldiers
Chetniks of the Macedonian Struggle
1854 births
1915 deaths
People from the Kingdom of Serbia
People from Svrljig
Regicides